PGM may refer to:

Math and science 

 probabilistic graphical model, which can be directed or undirected
 Phosphoglycerate mutase, an enzyme that catalyses step 8 of glycolysis
 Phosphoglucomutase, an enzyme that interconverts G6P and G1P
 Platinum group metals, six metallic elements grouped together on the periodic table of the elements

Computers 

 Portable Graymap File Format, a Netpbm format file format for images
 Pragmatic General Multicast, an Internet transport protocol for reliable multicast

Military and navy 

 Precision-guided munition, a term for a guided weapon
 PGM Précision, a French precision weapon maker
 Patrol Gunboat Motor, PGM-39-class gunboat used in the United States Navy's ship classification system

Music 

 Ibanez PGM, the signature guitar model of Paul Gilbert
 Playground Music Scandinavia, a Swedish record label

Other 

 Greek Magical Papyri, a collection of ancient texts also known as the Papyri Graecae Magicae.
 Past Grand Master, the former head of the Grand Masonic lodge.
 Provincial Grand Master (PGM or PrGM), the ruler of an internal masonic province.
 Honda's programmed fuel injection system.
 PolyGame Master, an arcade system board made by IGS
 PGM Inspection Company
 Proto-Germanic, the reconstructed ancestor of all Germanic languages